Lewedorp is a village in the Dutch province of Zeeland. It is a part of the municipality of Borsele, and lies about 9 km east of Middelburg.

The village was first mentioned in 1913 as Noordkraaijert. It was renamed on 13 August 1929 and refers to Unico Evert Lewe van Neijenstein, the mayor of 's-Heer Arendskerke between 1892 until 1933. The village used to be located near the ferry to Zuid-Beveland and Walcheren which operated from 1755 until 1872.

Lewedorp used to be part of 's-Heer Arendskerke until 1970 when it was merged into Borsele.

Gallery

References

Populated places in Zeeland
Borsele